The Reymer Brothers Candy Factory (also known as the Forbes Pride Building, or Forbes Med-Tech Center) in the Bluff neighborhood of Pittsburgh, Pennsylvania, was built in 1906 in the Richardsonian Romanesque style.

Reymer and Anderson was one of the first confectionaries in Pittsburgh and it boomed during the Civil War when people sent their candies to soldiers. They prospered during the last half of the nineteenth century as Phillip Reymer's sons, Jacob and Harmer, took over the business.  By 1906 when the new factory was built, the Reymer family had left the business but their name lived on. In 1908 the firm claimed that it was "one of the largest confectionery houses in the world," and that it had 5,000 vendors in the Pittsburgh area.

The firm ran five teahouses in Pittsburgh.  These may have contributed to perception that the firm made quality products, but were unprofitable. An uncarbonated soft drink "Lemon Blennd" accounted for 70% of their sales in 1959.  The company was taken over in 1959 by a competitor, Dimling's, which went out of business in 1969.

The building was listed on the National Register of Historic Places in 1997.

References

Industrial buildings and structures on the National Register of Historic Places in Pennsylvania
Romanesque Revival architecture in Pennsylvania
Industrial buildings completed in 1906
Industrial buildings and structures in Pittsburgh
National Register of Historic Places in Pittsburgh
1906 establishments in Pennsylvania